Pseudothecadactylus is a genus of geckos found in various states of Australia.

Species
Three species are recognized as being valid.
Pseudothecadactylus australis  – Cape York pad-tail gecko
Pseudothecadactylus cavaticus 
Pseudothecadactylus lindneri  – giant cave gecko

Nota bene: A binomial authority in parentheses indicates that the species was originally described in a genus other than Pseudothecadactylus.

The specific name, lindneri, is in honor of Australian herpetologist David A. Lindner.

References

Further reading
Brongersma L (1936). "Herpetological Note XIII". Zoologische Mededelingen 19: 136. (Pseudothecadactylus, new genus).
Cogger HG (1975). "New lizards of the genus Pseudothecadactylus (Lacertilia: Gekkonidae) from Arnhem Land and northwestern Australia". Rec. Australian Mus. 30: 87-97.
Cogger HG (1992). Reptiles and Amphibians of Australia, Fifth Edition. Ithaca, New York: Cornell University Press.
Rösler, Herbert (1995). Geckos der Welt - Alle Gattungen. Leipzig: Urania. 256 pp. (in German).
Smith LA (1989). "Taxonomic status of the gecko Pseudothecadactylus lindneri cavaticus Cogger". Rec. W. Australian Mus. 14: 425-426.

 
Lizard genera
Taxa named by Leo Brongersma
Geckos of Australia